Timothy Robert Birkhead  (born 1950) is a British ornithologist. He has been Professor of Behaviour and Evolution at the University of Sheffield since 1976.

Education
Birkhead was awarded a Bachelor's degree in Biology from Newcastle University in 1972, followed by a Doctor of Philosophy degree from University of Oxford in 1976 for research on the breeding biology and survival of guillemots Uria aalge supervised by E.K. Dunn and Chris Perrins. He was subsequently awarded a Doctor of Science from Newcastle in 1989.

Research and career
Birkhead's research on promiscuity in birds redefined the mating systems of birds. Focusing initially on the adaptive significance of male promiscuity and female promiscuity, he later switched to the study of mechanisms and resolved the mechanisms of sperm competition in birds. He provided some of the first evidence of: cryptic female choice in birds; strategic sperm allocation, and he also provided the first estimates of the quantitative genetics of sperm traits in birds.

Birkhead's research also resolved the issue of polyspermy in birds and provided the first evidence for morphological sperm selection in the female reproductive tract. His long term study of the population biology of common guillemots on the island of Skomer off Wales has run since 1972, and is currently in need of support.

His recent research is on the adaptive significance of egg shape in birds, including the common guillemot whose pyriform egg has long been thought to allow it to either spin-like- a-top or roll-in-an-arc to prevent it rolling off the cliff ledge. However, there is no evidence for either of these ideas. Instead, Birkhead and colleagues have identified the main advantage of a pyriform shape: stability. The pyriform shape makes the egg inherently more stable, especially on the sloping surfaces on which guillemots commonly breed.

Publications 

 Nettleship, D. N. & Birkhead, T. R. (eds) (1985) The Atlantic Alcidae. Academic Press. pp 574.
 Birkhead, T. R. & Møller, A. P. (1992). Sperm Competition in Birds: Evolutionary Causes and Consequences. Academic Press. pp. 280.
 Birkhead, T. R. & Moller A. P. (eds) (1998) Sperm Competition and Sexual Selection. Academic Press. pp 826.
 Birkhead, T. R., Hosken, D. & Pitnick, S. (eds) (2009). Sperm Biology: An Evolutionary Perspective. London: Academic Press. pp 642.
 Birkhead, T. R. (ed) (2016). Virtuoso by Nature: the Scientific Worlds of Francis Willughby FRS (1635-1672). Brill. pp 439.
 Promiscuity: An Evolutionary History of Sperm Competition
 Promiscuity (Faber & Faber 2000), which makes the concept of post-copulatory sexual selection accessible to the non-specialist.
 Ten Thousand Birds: Ornithology since Darwin (Princeton 2014) (with J. Wimpenny and R. Montgomerie), won the USA Prose Award. PROSE Award (American Publishers Awards for Professional and Scholarly Excellence) for the best book in 2014 in the History of Science, Medicine and Technology category; CHOICE (magazine of the American Library Association) list of Outstanding Academic Titles, 2014 in Zoology; Runner-up for BB/BTO Best Bird Book of 2014.
 The red canary: the story of the first genetically engineered animal, Phoenix, 2004,  describes the power of selective breeding and the how the interaction between professional scientist and an amateur bird-keeper created the red canary. The book won the Consul Cremer Prize (2003).
 ; Bloomsbury Publishing, 2011,  The book describes how we know what we know about the biology of birds, focussing on evolutionary explanations. The Wisdom of Birds won the Best Bird book of the Year Award (2009) from the British Trust for Ornithology and British Birds.
 
 
 Ten Thousand Birds: Ornithology since Darwin, Princeton University Press, 2011, 
 Bird Sense: What it Is Like to Be a Bird, Bloomsbury Publishing Plc, 2012,  was rated best natural history book of 2012 by the Independent and Guardian Newspapers, and was awarded a Best Bird Book of 2012 prize by British Birds and the British Trust for Ornithology, and was short-listed for the Royal Society Winton Book Prize in 2013.
 The Most Perfect Thing: the Inside (and Outside) of a Bird's Egg, Bloomsbury Publishing Plc, 2016,  short-listed for the Royal Society Insight Investment Science Book Prize (2016),  and winner of the Zoological Society of London's 2017 prize for communicating zoology. David Attenborough described it as ‘Magnificent: science without any high falutin’ technology’.
 The Wonderful Mr Willughby: the first True Ornithologist, Bloomsbury Publishing Plc, 2018,

Teaching 
Birkhead has combined his enthusiasm for research with a passion for undergraduate teaching. He has taught courses on ecology, evolution, statistics, birds, behavioural ecology, animal behaviour and the history and philosophy of science. His teaching has been recognised by four awards, including a National Teaching Fellowship in 2017.

Biology of Spermatozoa 
Starting in 1992 and continuing until 2015 (when he handed over to a steering group) Birkhead organised (with Professor Harry Moore) a small (~60) biennial meeting on reproductive biology in the Peak District National Park known as Biology of Spermatozoa (BoS). Delegates are from a diverse range of backgrounds and include clinicians, reproductive physiologists, andrologists, theoreticians and evolutionary biologists. The format and interdisciplinary nature of the meeting was successful in terms of exchanging ideas, techniques and establishing collaborations.

Media and Outreach 
Between 2002 and 2010 Birkhead had a monthly column in Times Higher Education. His articles were concerned with various aspects of higher education: undergraduate teaching, administration and, occasionally, research.

He has written for The Guardian, The Independent, the BBC, The Biologist, Natural History and Evolve.

He has featured on numerous BBC Radio 4 programmes, including Start the Week — with Jeremy Paxman; The Life Scientific with Jim Al-Khalili; The Infinite Monkey Cage in 2018. His book ‘The Most Perfect Thing’ provided the basis for the TV documentary ‘Attenborough’s Eggs’ introduced by David Attenborough (2018). Birkhead has been honorary curator of the Alfred Denny Museum in the University of Sheffield between 1980-2018.

He has given numerous public lectures, including at Café Scientique, the Cheltenham Science Festival and numerous literary festivals including Ways with Words (Sheffield) and Hay on Wye. His a TED (conference) lecture on the history of ornithology has been viewed over 100,000 times.

Awards and honours 
Over the course of his career, Birkhead has received a number of awards:

 McColvin Medal for best reference book: Cambridge Encyclopaedia of Ornithology in 1991
 President, International Society for Behavioural Ecology (1996-1998)
 Brockington Visitorship, Queens University, Canada in 2003
 Consul Cremer Prize for The Red Canary in 2003
 Elected a Fellow of the Royal Society (FRS) in 2004
 ISIHighlyCited.com - Designated Highly Cited Researcher Plant &amp; Animal Science, 2004
 Senate Award for Sustained Excellence in Teaching, University of Sheffield, 2007.
 Animal & Plant Sciences ‘Teacher of the Year’, 2009.
 Winner: Bird Book of the Year Award, for The Wisdom of Birds, from the British Trust for Ornithology and British Birds, 2009.
 Elected Honorary Member of the American Ornithologists Union, 2010.
 Elected Honorary Member of the Linnaean Society of New York, 2011
 Elliot Coues Medal, American Ornithologists Union in 2011
 ASAB (Association for the Study of Animal Behaviour) Medal in 2012
 President of the Association for the Study of Animal Behaviour 2013-16
 Vice-president of the British Trust for Ornithology in 2012
 Winner of the Society for Biology, Bioscience Teacher of the Year, 2013.
 Zoological Society of London, Silver Medal, 2014.
 Spallazani Medal, Biology of Spermatozoa community, 2015.
 Eisenmann Medal, the Linnaean Society of New York, 2016.
 Godman-Salvin Medal from the British Ornithologists' Union, 2016.
 Founders’ Medal of the Society for the Study of the History of Natural History (SHNH), 2016.
 Winner of the Zoological Society of London’s Award for Communicating Zoology to a general audience for The Most Perfect Thing, 2017.
 Stephen Jay Gould Prize for increasing public understanding of evolutionary biology, Evolution Society, 2017.
 Awarded a National Teaching Fellowship by the Higher Education Academy (HEA) in 2017.
 Elected Honorary Member of the (Deutschen Ornitholgen-Gesellschaft [DO-G] German Ornithological Society), 2017

References

British zoologists
Academics of the University of Sheffield
Alumni of the University of Oxford
Fellows of the Royal Society
Alumni of Newcastle University
Living people
1950 births
Place of birth missing (living people)
British science writers